Andrachne telephioides is a species of shrub in the family Phyllanthaceae. They have a self-supporting growth form and simple, broad leaves. Individuals can grow to 12 cm.

Sources

References 

Phyllanthaceae
Flora of Malta